The following is an alphabetical list of articles related to the U.S. state of Connecticut.

0–9 

.ct.us – Internet second-level domain for the state of Connecticut
5th state to ratify the Constitution of the United States of America

A
Adjacent states:

Agriculture in Connecticut
Airports in Connecticut
Amusement parks in Connecticut
Aquaria in Connecticut
commons:Category:Aquaria in Connecticut
Arboreta in Connecticut
commons:Category:Arboreta in Connecticut
Archaeology in Connecticut
Architecture in Connecticut
Area codes in Connecticut
Art museums and galleries in Connecticut
commons:Category:Art museums and galleries in Connecticut
Astronomical observatories in Connecticut
commons:Category:Astronomical observatories in Connecticut

B
Beaches of Connecticut
commons:Category:Beaches of Connecticut
Botanical gardens in Connecticut
commons:Category:Botanical gardens in Connecticut
Bridgeport, Connecticut
Buildings and structures in Connecticut
commons:Category:Buildings and structures in Connecticut

C

Capital of the State of Connecticut
Capitol of the State of Connecticut
commons:Category:Connecticut State Capitol
Casinos in Connecticut
Census statistical areas of Connecticut
Cities in Connecticut
commons:Category:Cities in Connecticut
Climate of Connecticut
Climate change in Connecticut 
Colony of Connecticut, 1636–1686 and 1689–1776
Colony of New-Haven, 1637–1662
Colleges and universities in Connecticut
commons:Category:Universities and colleges in Connecticut
Communications in Connecticut
commons:Category:Communications in Connecticut
Companies in Connecticut
:Category:Companies based in Connecticut
Congressional districts of Connecticut
Connecticut  website
:Category:Connecticut
commons:Category:Connecticut
commons:Category:Maps of Connecticut
Connecticut Business Hall of Fame
Connecticut College Black Womanhood Conference
Connecticut Constitutional History
Connecticut Environmental Policy Act
The Connecticut March
Connecticut Port Authority
Connecticut State Capitol
Connecticut State News Bureau
Connecticut State Police

Connecticut State Troubadour
Constitution of the State of Connecticut
Convention centers in Connecticut
commons:Category:Convention centers in Connecticut
Counties of the state of Connecticut
commons:Category:Counties in Connecticut
CT – United States Postal Service postal code for the state of Connecticut
Culture of Connecticut
commons:Category:Connecticut culture

D
Demographics of Connecticut
Dominion of New-England in America, 1686–1689

E
Economy of Connecticut
:Category:Economy of Connecticut
commons:Category:Economy of Connecticut
Education in Connecticut
:Category:Education in Connecticut
commons:Category:Education in Connecticut
Elections in Connecticut
commons:Category:Connecticut elections
Environment of Connecticut
commons:Category:Environment of Connecticut

F

Festivals in Connecticut
commons:Category:Festivals in Connecticut
Flag of the state of Connecticut
Forts in Connecticut
:Category:Forts in Connecticut
commons:Category:Forts in Connecticut
Fundamental Orders of Connecticut, 1638

G

Gardens in Connecticut
commons:Category:Gardens in Connecticut
Geography of Connecticut
:Category:Geography of Connecticut
commons:Category:Geography of Connecticut
Geology of Connecticut
:Category:Geology of Connecticut
commons:Category:Geology of Connecticut
Ghost towns in Connecticut
:Category:Ghost towns in Connecticut
commons:Category:Ghost towns in Connecticut
Golf clubs and courses in Connecticut
Government of the state of Connecticut  website
:Category:Government of Connecticut
commons:Category:Government of Connecticut
Governor of the State of Connecticut
List of governors of Connecticut
Great Seal of the State of Connecticut

H
Hartford, Connecticut, colonial capital 1639-1686 and 1689–1701, co-capital 1701–1875, sole state capital since 1875
Heritage railroads in Connecticut
commons:Category:Heritage railroads in Connecticut
High schools of Connecticut
Higher education in Connecticut
Highway routes in Connecticut
Hiking trails in Connecticut
commons:Category:Hiking trails in Connecticut
History of Connecticut
Historical outline of Connecticut
:Category:History of Connecticut
commons:Category:History of Connecticut
Hospitals in Connecticut
House of Representatives of the State of Connecticut

I
Images of Connecticut
commons:Category:Connecticut
Islands of Connecticut

J

K

L
Lake Compounce in Bristol, Connecticut (an amusement park)
Lakes of Connecticut
commons:Category:Lakes of Connecticut
Landmarks in Connecticut
commons:Category:Landmarks in Connecticut
Lieutenant Governor of the State of Connecticut
Lists related to the state of Connecticut:
List of airports in Connecticut
List of census statistical areas in Connecticut
List of cities in Connecticut
List of colleges and universities in Connecticut
List of companies in Connecticut
List of United States congressional districts in Connecticut
List of counties in Connecticut
List of forts in Connecticut
List of ghost towns in Connecticut
List of governors of Connecticut
List of high schools in Connecticut
List of highway routes in Connecticut
List of hospitals in Connecticut
List of individuals executed in Connecticut
List of islands of Connecticut
List of law enforcement agencies in Connecticut
List of lieutenant governors of Connecticut
List of museums in Connecticut
List of National Historic Landmarks in Connecticut
List of people from Connecticut
List of radio stations in Connecticut
List of railroads in Connecticut
List of Registered Historic Places in Connecticut
List of rivers of Connecticut
List of school districts in Connecticut
List of state forests in Connecticut
List of state parks in Connecticut
List of state prisons in Connecticut
List of state symbols of Connecticut
List of telephone area codes in Connecticut
List of television shows set in Connecticut
List of television stations in Connecticut
List of towns in Connecticut
List of United States congressional delegations from Connecticut
List of United States congressional districts in Connecticut
List of United States representatives from Connecticut
List of United States senators from Connecticut

M
Maps of Connecticut
commons:Category:Maps of Connecticut
Mass media in Connecticut
Monuments and memorials in Connecticut
commons:Category:Monuments and memorials in Connecticut
Mountains of Connecticut
commons:Category:Mountains of Connecticut
Museums in Connecticut
:Category:Museums in Connecticut
commons:Category:Museums in Connecticut
Music of Connecticut
:Category:Music of Connecticut
commons:Category:Music of Connecticut
:Category:Musical groups from Connecticut
:Category:Musicians from Connecticut

N
Natural history of Connecticut
commons:Category:Natural history of Connecticut
Nature centers in Connecticut
commons:Category:Nature centers in Connecticut
New England
New-Haven, capital of Colony of New-Haven 1640–1662, colonial and state co-capital 1701-1875
New York-Newark-Bridgeport, NY-NJ-CT-PA Combined Statistical Area
Newspapers of Connecticut

P
People from Connecticut
:Category:People from Connecticut
commons:Category:People from Connecticut
:Category:People by city in Connecticut
:Category:People by county in Connecticut
:Category:People from Connecticut by occupation
Pequot War, 1636–1637
Politics of Connecticut
Portal:Connecticut
Protected areas of Connecticut
commons:Category:Protected areas of Connecticut

Q

R
Radio stations in Connecticut
Railroad museums in Connecticut
commons:Category:Railroad museums in Connecticut
Railroads in Connecticut
Registered historic places in Connecticut
commons:Category:Registered Historic Places in Connecticut
Religion in Connecticut
:Category:Religion in Connecticut
commons:Category:Religion in Connecticut
Rivers of Connecticut
commons:Category:Rivers of Connecticut

S
School districts of Connecticut
Scouting in Connecticut
Senate of the State of Connecticut
Settlements in Connecticut
Cities in Connecticut
Towns in Connecticut
Villages in Connecticut
Census Designated Places in Connecticut
Other unincorporated communities in Connecticut
List of ghost towns in Connecticut
Ski areas and resorts in Connecticut
commons:Category:Ski areas and resorts in Connecticut
Sports in Connecticut
:Category:Sports in Connecticut
commons:Category:Sports in Connecticut
:Category:Sports venues in Connecticut
commons:Category:Sports venues in Connecticut
State Capitol of Connecticut
State of Connecticut  website
Constitution of the State of Connecticut
Government of the State of Connecticut
:Category:Government of Connecticut
commons:Category:Government of Connecticut
Executive branch of the government of the State of Connecticut
Governor of the State of Connecticut
Legislative branch of the government of the State of Connecticut
General Assembly of the State of Connecticut
Senate of the State of Connecticut
House of Representatives of the State of Connecticut
Judicial branch of the government of the State of Connecticut
Supreme Court of the State of Connecticut
State parks of Connecticut
commons:Category:State parks of Connecticut
State Police of Connecticut
State prisons of Connecticut
Structures in Connecticut
commons:Category:Buildings and structures in Connecticut
Superfund sites in Connecticut
Supreme Court of the State of Connecticut
Symbols of the State of Connecticut
:Category:Symbols of Connecticut
commons:Category:Symbols of Connecticut

T
Telecommunications in Connecticut
commons:Category:Communications in Connecticut
Telephone area codes in Connecticut
Television shows set in Connecticut
Television stations in Connecticut
Theatres in Connecticut
commons:Category:Theatres in Connecticut
Tourism in Connecticut  website
commons:Category:Tourism in Connecticut
Towns in Connecticut
commons:Category:Cities in Connecticut
Transportation in Connecticut
:Category:Transportation in Connecticut
commons:Category:Transport in Connecticut

U
United States of America
States of the United States of America
United States census statistical areas of Connecticut
United States congressional delegations from Connecticut
United States congressional districts in Connecticut
United States Court of Appeals for the Second Circuit
United States District Court for the District of Connecticut
United States representatives from Connecticut
United States senators from Connecticut
Universities and colleges in Connecticut
commons:Category:Universities and colleges in Connecticut
US-CT – ISO 3166-2:US region code for the State of Connecticut

V

W 
Waterfalls of Connecticut
commons:Category:Waterfalls of Connecticut
Wikimedia
Wikimedia Commons:Category:Connecticut
commons:Category:Maps of Connecticut
Wikinews:Category:Connecticut
Wikinews:Portal:Connecticut
Wikipedia Category:Connecticut
Wikipedia Portal:Connecticut
Wikipedia:WikiProject Connecticut
:Category:WikiProject Connecticut articles
Wikipedia:WikiProject Connecticut#Members

 Willimantic, Connecticut

X

Y

Z
Zoos in Connecticut
commons:Category:Zoos in Connecticut

See also

Topic overview:
Connecticut
Outline of Connecticut

Connecticut
 
Connecticut